L68 may refer to:
 Albatros L 68, a 1920s German two-seat trainer aircraft
 Haplogroup I-L68 (Y-DNA), a subclade of haplogroup I2 (Y-DNA)
 HMS Eridge (L68), a 1940  Royal Navy Hunt class destroyer
 hypertrichosis ICD-10 code

ℓ 68 may refer to :
 Lectionary 68, a 12th-century Greek manuscript of the New Testament on vellum leaves